Jan Schaffartzik (born 25 December 1987) is a Czech footballer who plays as a defender or midfielder for Opava.

Career

Schaffartzik started his career with Czech third division side Opava, helping them achieve promotion to the Czech top flight.

References

External links
 
 

Czech footballers
Living people
SFC Opava players
Czech National Football League players
Czech First League players
1987 births
Association football defenders
FC Dolní Benešov players
FK Frýdek-Místek players
FC Hlučín players
Association football midfielders